Hässelby station may refer to:

Hässelby gård metro station, a station on the Green line of the metro in Stockholm, Sweden
Hässelby strand metro station, a station on the Green line of the metro in Stockholm, Sweden
, a former station on the Spånga to Lövsta railway in Stockholm, Sweden